Abū 'Ubayd al-Jūzjānī, (d.1070), was a Persian physician and chronicler from Guzgan.

He was the famous pupil of Avicenna, whom he first met in Gorgan.
He spent many years with his master in Isfahan, becoming his lifetime companion. After Avicenna's death, he completed Avicenna's Autobiography with a concluding section.

The historian  Ibn Abi Usaibia refers Avicenna and his close companion Abu Ubayd lived together the residence of Sheikh al-Raiss (which is the title given to Avicenna) and were used to pass each night on studying one by one the Canon and Shifā's instructions.

See also
List of Iranian scientists

References

External links
  (PDF version)

11th-century Iranian physicians
1070 deaths
Pupils of Avicenna
Iranian Freemasons
People from Jowzjan Province